Phonology is a textbook by Philip Carr and Jean-Pierre Montreuil designed for both introductory courses and advanced courses in phonology.

Reception
The book was reviewed by Ken Lodge and Snezhina Dimitrova.

References

External links
Phonology

Phonology books
Linguistics textbooks
Palgrave Macmillan books
1993 non-fiction books